Messina Hof is a Texas-based winery that was founded by Merrill and Paul Bonarrigo in 1977, making it the third oldest winery in the state. The winery's name is derived from Messina, Sicily, and Hof, Germany, from where the families of Paul and Merrill Bonarrigo originate.

Overview 
The vineyard grows Black Spanish, Pinot Grigio Sagrantino, and Sangiovese grapes which are all suited to the local climate, which is similar to the European wine making region of Burgundy.

Label Controversy 
The label of Messina Hof's Tex-Zin wine was designed by Texan artist Emma Stark, and depicted children in a vineyard.  The piece was criticized because of the shape of a "fold in the middle child's clothing".  The fold would be covered by vine leaves in later productions of the wine.

References

Wineries in Texas
Brazos County, Texas